Frederick High School (FHS) is a four-year public high school in the city of Frederick in Frederick County, Maryland, United States. A National Blue Ribbon School of Excellence, Frederick High is the oldest school in Frederick County, the school's diverse population reflects its surrounding dynamic community.
Frederick High School opened in 1891 with girls and boys attending school in different buildings and matriculation occurring after three years. The former facility opened in 1939 and was demolished in 2018, with the current building opening in the fall of 2018. The school serves the city of Frederick along with Governor Thomas Johnson High School and Tuscarora High School.

History
The Board of Education identified the modernization of older schools as a priority in the capital improvement program. A recent facility assessment study evaluated the physical condition of Frederick County Schools, as well as the ability to provide the current required curriculum. Frederick High was ranked highest in priority for high schools needing a complete renovation/modernization.

The school is located at 650 Carroll Parkway in historic downtown Frederick City. It is just north of Maryland Route 144, east of U.S. 15, south of West 2nd Street, and east of West College Terrace. Frederick High School was initially constructed in 1939 with additions in 1955, 1967, 1977 and 1980. Approximately one third of the building was renovated in 1977. While a few systemic improvements have been made to the school such as roof repairs, no other significant renovations had occurred in almost 35 years.

In the summer of 2012 a feasibility study was begun to explore options to renovate FHS. The Board of Education unanimously voted to allow students to remain in the current 1939 building while constructing a new school on the Frederick campus. The first step in the modernization of Frederick High was to perform a feasibility study. The purpose of the feasibility study was to identify school facility renovation/modernization needs and the cost of meeting those needs.

The study was completed in December 2012 and in February 2013, the Board of Education approved Option Number 5 to construct a new facility on the existing site located on the existing parking lot to the west of the existing building. Option 5 received approval from the Designees of the Interagency Committee on School Construction in February 2011.
                                                                                                                                    
The new Frederick High has a capacity for 1,826 students. The building has been designed to meet LEED silver standards for environmentally friendly operations. The new Frederick High will cost more than $114 million, according to numbers released by FCPS.

Demographics
Frederick High School is one of the most diverse high schools in Maryland and its demographic breakdown as of 2020–2021 is

Population
The school's population had been steadily rising until 2003 when Tuscarora High School opened in southern Frederick.

Approximately 90% of students attend four-year college, business, technical schools or community college. Frederick High's SAT scores continue to outdistance the average of those in the state of Maryland and the nation. Frederick High School's graduation rate has been steady over the past 12 years. In 2007 the school graduated 92.75%, the highest rate since 1993 when it reached 93.35%, up from a low of 90.65% in 2004. The AP participation rate at Frederick High is 40 percent. The student body makeup is 51 percent male and 49 percent female.

Notable alumni
 Lefty Kreh - fly fishing icon
 Chuck Foreman – former NFL player
 Charlie Keller – former MLB player (New York Yankees, Detroit Tigers)
 Don Loun – former MLB player (Washington Senators)
 David Gallaher - award-winning author, graphic novelist and video game writer. 
 Senator Charles "Mac" Mathias – former United States Senator
Derrick Miller - US Army Sergeant sentenced to life in prison for premeditated murder of Afghan civilian during battlefield interrogation; granted parole and released after 8 years. 
 Alex X. Mooney – U.S. Congressman
 Soon Hee Newbold – musician, composer, and conductor
 Bobby Steggert – actor, nominated for the Best Performance by a Featured Actor in a Play Tony Award for his role in Ragtime

Sports
State Champions

 2019 - Girls' Basketball
 2018 - Girls' Basketball
 2017 - Girls' Track & Field
 2017 - Girls' Basketball
 2015 – Unified Bocce
 2011 – Girls' Basketball
 2011 – Girls' Swimming
 2010 – Unified Track & Field
 2010 – Girls' Swimming
 2009 – Baseball
 1996 – Girls' Indoor Track
 1996 – Girls' Track & Field
 1995 – Girls' Cross Country
 1989 – Girls' Cross Country
 1986 – Boys' Track & Field
 1983 – Girls' Indoor Track
 1983 – Girls' Track & Field
 1982 – Boys' Basketball
 1982 – Girls' Indoor Track
 1982 – Girls' Track & Field
 1981 – Boys' Cross Country B
 1981 – Girls' Indoor Track
 1981 – Girls' Track & Field
 1980 – Girls' Indoor Track
 1980 – Girls' Track & Field
 1979 – Girls' Track & Field
 1978 – Boys' Basketball
 1974 – Boys' Basketball
 1972 – Boys' Golf
 1970 – Boys' Track & Field
 1969 – Football
 1969 – Boys' Track & Field
 1968 – Boys' Track & Field
 1967 – Boys' Basketball
 1967 – Boys' Track & Field
 1962 – Boys' Track & Field
 1957 – Boys' Basketball
 1952 – Football
 1917 – Football
 1915 – Football

See also
 List of high schools in Maryland
 Frederick County Public Schools

References and notes

External links
 Frederick High School website
 Online Edition of the High Flier -- Frederick High's Student Newspaper
 School district site

Educational institutions established in 1890
Public high schools in Maryland
Schools in Frederick County, Maryland
Education in Frederick, Maryland
1890 establishments in Maryland
Buildings and structures in Frederick, Maryland